Ghuman is a village situated near University of Gujrat in the district of Gujrat, Pakistan. The main tribe of the Ghuman village is Ghuman [Jutt]  and other little clans include Warraich,Maher and chemma.

References

Villages in Gujrat District